Yevgeny Nikolayevich Perevertaylo (born 23 June 1955) is a Russian professional football coach and a former player. He is the manager of FC Murom.

Club career
As a player, he made his debut in the Soviet Second League in 1982 for FC Mashuk Pyatigorsk.

Personal life
His son Vladimir Perevertaylo is a football player.

References

1955 births
Living people
People from Novoselitsky District
Soviet footballers
Russian footballers
Russian expatriate footballers
Expatriate footballers in the Czech Republic
Russian football managers
FC SKA Rostov-on-Don managers
FC Baltika Kaliningrad managers
FC Ufa managers
Russian Premier League managers
FC Sibir Novosibirsk managers
Association football midfielders
FC Tosno managers
Russian expatriate football managers
Expatriate football managers in Latvia
FC Dynamo Stavropol managers
Riga FC managers
Sportspeople from Stavropol Krai
FC Mashuk-KMV Pyatigorsk players